The Institute of International Politics and Economics is one of the oldest research institutes in South Eastern Europe specialised in the field of international relations. It is headquartered in Belgrade, Serbia.  Since it was established in 1947, the Institute of International Politics and Economics has had a special place in the academic life of the country. From a small group of researchers who laid foundations of the Yugoslav science of international relations, the Institute has gradually turned into the largest scientific institution in the country and one of the most reputable research and Para-diplomatic centres in the world. The Institute studies the processes and phenomena in the field of international politics and economics, this also including legal aspects of international relations, which are of interest for the position and foreign policy of the State.

Development and inclusion of Serbia into modern political, economic, legal, cultural and educational trends in the coming period will require a wider differentiation of tasks in the field of scientific education and research of foreign policy, the economy and international law. The interest of the Institute is to maintain its dominant position in the above scientific sphere in the future, but also to encourage the activities of other scientific institutions for dealing with foreign policy, economic and international legal issues.

History

The Institute of International Politics and Economics was established on 7 December 1947 by the Government of the Federal People's Republic of Yugoslavia. In these first days of its existence, the Institute has provided an objective scientific basis for determining the overall strategy of foreign policy of former Yugoslavia that the realization of the independent position has been conditio sine qua non for preservation the cohesion of the new federal structure of the state and the construction of a socialist society. In that period the Institute has become one of the birthplaces of the idea for the establishment of the Non-Aligned Movement. In the period after that, the Institute has several times changed its legal status (Law on the Institute for International Politics and Economics, "Official Gazette of SFRY", No. 11/1974, The Regulation on the Federal Public Institution – Institute for International Politics and Economics, "Official Gazette", Nos. 11/1997, 5/2002). After the breakup of Yugoslavia and the disintegration of the State Union of Serbia and Montenegro, the Institute ceased to function as institutions of federal importance. With the Government Decision on the exercise of founding rights in public enterprises, public institutions and organizations in which the founder's rights was the Federal Republic of Yugoslavia ("Official Gazette of the Republic of Serbia", No. 49/2006), the Institute came under the jurisdiction of the Serbian Ministry of Science and Technological Development (Law on Scientific Research, "Official Gazette of the Republic of Serbia" No. 110/2005, 50/2006 – corr. and 18/2010)

During its existence, the Institute of International Politics and Economics has proven to be a scientific research institution of special social and national interest. Associates of the Institute were engaged in the study of important issues in the field of foreign policy, international economy and international law. For many years, the Institute of International Politics and Economics has been the center of the study of international relations.

In 2017, the IIPE received the Sretenje Order of the President of the Republic of Serbia for a special contribution to the study of international relations, marking the 70th anniversary of the Institute.

List of directors

See also
Yugoslavia and the Non-Aligned Movement

References

External links
Official Website

1947 establishments in Yugoslavia
Political and economic think tanks based in Europe
Political organizations based in Serbia
Non-Aligned Movement
Foreign policy and strategy think tanks
Think tanks based in Serbia
Think tanks established in 1947
Deposit libraries
Foreign relations of Serbia
Foreign relations of Serbia and Montenegro
Foreign relations of Yugoslavia
Political research institutes